is a male former international table tennis player from Japan.

Table tennis career
In 1969, 1971 and 1977 he won three medals in team events in the World Table Tennis Championships.

His three medals at the World Championship included a gold medal in the Swaythling Cup (men's team) at the 1969 World Table Tennis Championships for Japan.

See also
 List of table tennis players
 List of World Table Tennis Championships medalists

References

Japanese male table tennis players